Hazel-Ann Regis (born 1 February 1981) is a retired Grenadian sprinter who specialized in the 400 metres.

She participated at the World Championships in Athletics in 1999, 2003 and 2005 as well as the Summer Olympics in 2000 and 2004, without reaching the final.

Her personal best time is 50.64 seconds, achieved in May 2004 in Oxford.

Competition record

External links

1981 births
Living people
Grenadian female sprinters
Athletes (track and field) at the 2000 Summer Olympics
Athletes (track and field) at the 2002 Commonwealth Games
Athletes (track and field) at the 2003 Pan American Games
Athletes (track and field) at the 2004 Summer Olympics
Athletes (track and field) at the 2006 Commonwealth Games
Athletes (track and field) at the 2007 Pan American Games
Olympic athletes of Grenada
Commonwealth Games competitors for Grenada
Pan American Games medalists in athletics (track and field)
Pan American Games silver medalists for Grenada
Central American and Caribbean Games silver medalists for Grenada
Competitors at the 2006 Central American and Caribbean Games
Central American and Caribbean Games medalists in athletics
Medalists at the 2003 Pan American Games
Olympic female sprinters